Partenheimer is a surname. Notable people with the surname include:

Hal Partenheimer (born 1956), American soccer player
Jürgen Partenheimer (born 1947), German artist
Stan Partenheimer (1922–1989), American baseball pitcher
Steve Partenheimer (1891–1971), American baseball player